Cora elephas is a species of basidiolichen in the family Hygrophoraceae. It was formally described as a new species in 2016 by Robert Lücking, Bibiana Moncada, and Leidy Yasmín Vargas-Mendoza. The specific epithet elephas refers the "grey colour and elephant skin-like consistency" of the lichen. Cora elephas is one of the largest species in genus Cora.

References

elephas
Lichen species
Lichens described in 2016
Lichens of Colombia
Lichens of Ecuador
Taxa named by Robert Lücking
Basidiolichens